Edgar Henry Gerhart (December 18, 1923 – May 25, 1992) was a lawyer, judge and politician from Alberta, Canada. He served in the Legislative Assembly of Alberta from 1952 to 1971 as a member of the Social Credit caucus in government. He served as a cabinet minister in the governments of Ernest Manning and Harry Strom from 1967 to 1971.

Early life
Edgar Henry Gerhart was born on December 18, 1923 in the town of Drumheller, Alberta. His father was Clarence Gerhart served as a member of the Legislative Assembly representing Acadia-Coronation from 1940 to 1955, as well as several portfolio's in Premier Ernest Manning's cabinet, including Minister of Municipal Affairs. Edgar Gerhart would marry his wife Margaret Tiffin on March 4, 1944 in Calgary, and have five children together. Gerhart would attend the University of Alberta studying pharmacy like his father.

Political career
Gerhart first ran for a seat to the Alberta Legislature in the 1952 general election.  Running under the Social Credit banner, he took the fifth seat in the multi-member electoral district of Edmonton.  He was re-elected in the 1955 Alberta general election.

The Edmonton electoral district was broken up into single-member ridings in 1959, and Gerhart ran for re-election in the new district of Edmonton North West. He defeated Progressive Conservative candidate Ned Feehan and two other candidates with about 40% of the popular vote.

In 1960, Gerhart ran for a seat on Edmonton city council in the municipal election while still an MLA.  He finished 12th out of 15 candidates, short of a place on council.

In the 1963 general election, Gerhart faced Ned Feehan again as well as future MLA Grant Notley.  He retained his seat by a large margin.

In the 1967 general election, Gerhart defeated Progressive Conservative candidate Paul Norris by less than 500 votes.

Premier Ernest Manning appointed Gerhart Minister of Municipal Affairs on June 29, 1967. He held that portfolio until July 16, 1968 when he resigned to run for the leadership of the Social Credit Party.  Gerhart finished fifth out of six in the 1968 leadership election and dropped out of the race after the first ballot. The new premier, Harry Strom, appointed Gerhart Attorney General on December 10, 1968. Two days later he also reassumed the Municipal Affairs portfolio, which he held until May 27, 1969.

In 1971 Edmonton North West abolished, and Gerhart ran for re-election that year in the new electoral district of Edmonton-Calder.  He was defeated by Progressive Conservative candidate Tom Chambers.

References

External links
Legislative Assembly of Alberta Members Listing

1923 births
1992 deaths
Alberta Social Credit Party MLAs
Members of the Executive Council of Alberta